West Hammond is a census-designated place in San Juan County, New Mexico, United States. Its population was 2,790 as of the 2010 census.

Geography
West Hammond is located at coordinates 36 ° 41'8 "N 108 ° 2'29" W. According to the United States Census Bureau, West Hammond has a total area of 19.53 square kilometers, of which 19.33 km is land and (1.02%) 0.2 km is water.

Demographics

According to the 2010 census, 2,790 people were living in West Hammond. The population density was 142.87 inhabitants per square kilometer. Of the 2,790 inhabitants, West Hammond was composed by 72.83% White, 0.79% were African American, 14.3% were Native American, 0.07% were Asian, 0% were Pacific Islanders, 8.71% were of other races and 3.3% from two or more races. Of the total population 26.16% were Hispanic or Latino of any race.

Education 
The area school district is Bloomfield Schools. Bloomfield High School is the local high school.

References

Census-designated places in New Mexico
Census-designated places in San Juan County, New Mexico